The Wren Society is one of the many secret societies on the campus of the College of William and Mary. Founded in 1832 to honor the two hundredth birthday of Sir Christopher Wren, the society quickly grew in prominence. The society, like many other traditions of the Royal College, fell victim to the American Civil War. Restored in the 20th century by a number of students, the Wren Society has continued to assist the college. The society is thought to meet late at night on the grounds of the original college. Members are 'tapped' based upon their dedication to academics, commitment to service, and demonstration of exceptional leadership within the college community.  Membership in the society is steeped in secrecy, but is rumored to consist of a select number of upperclassmen leaders from all walks of campus life. Each individual member is given the decision to reveal themselves as a member of the society either during graduation proceedings or upon their death.

References

External links
Finding aid for the Student Organizations Collection, Special Collections Research Center, College of William & Mary, which includes the Wren Society.

Collegiate secret societies
College of William & Mary student life
1832 establishments in Virginia